Taseer is a Pakistani name. It may refer to:

 Aatish Taseer (born 1980), a journalist and writer, son of Salmaan Taseer
 M. D. Taseer (1902–1950), a Pakistani poet, writer and literary critic, father of Salmaan Taseer
 Salmaan Taseer (1944–2011), a Pakistani politician, who served as Governor of Punjab 
 Shahbaz Taseer, a Pakistani businessman, who was kidnapped, son of Salman Taseer
 Taseer Badar (born 1973), an entrepreneur and philanthropist